Sutadta Chuewulim (born 19 December 1992 in Kanchanaburi) is a Thai indoor volleyball player. She is a member of the Thailand women's national volleyball team.

Clubs
  Supreme Chonburi (2010–2014)
  Cagayan Valley Lady Rising Suns (2012)
  Bangkok Glass (2014–2017)
  Queen Air Force (2018–2019)
  United Volleyball Club (2019)
  BPI Globe BanKo Perlas Spikers (2019)
  Supreme Chonburi (2019–present)

Awards

Individuals
 2016 PSL Invitational Cup "Best Outside Spiker"
 2020 Thailand League "Best Outside Spiker"

Clubs
 2012 Shakey's V-League Open Conference 9th Season -   Runner-up, with Cagayan Valley Lady Rising Suns
 2014–2015 Thailand League -  Champion, with Bangkok Glass
 2015 Thai-Denmark Super League -  Champion, with Bangkok Glass
 2015 Asian Club Championship -  Champion, with Bangkok Glass
 2015–2016 Thailand League -  Champion, with Bangkok Glass
 2016 Thai-Denmark Super League -  Champion, with Bangkok Glass
 2016 Asian Club Championship -  Third, with Bangkok Glass
 2016 PSL Invitational Cup -  Champion, with Est Cola
 2016–17 Thailand League -  Runner-up, with Bangkok Glass
 2017 Thai-Denmark Super League -  Runner-up, with Bangkok Glass
 2017–18 Thailand League -  Third, with Bangkok Glass
 2018 Thai-Denmark Super League -  Runner-up, with Bangkok Glass
 2020 Thailand League –  Champion, with Supreme Chonburi

National team
 2008 Asian Youth Championship -  Bronze medal

References

External links
 FIVB Biography

Sutadta Chuewulim
Sutadta Chuewulim
Volleyball players at the 2010 Asian Games
1992 births
Living people
Sutadta Chuewulim
Sutadta Chuewulim
Outside hitters
Sutadta Chuewulim
Southeast Asian Games medalists in volleyball
Sutadta Chuewulim